Spyros Agrotis (born 5 November 1961) is a Cypriot former cyclist. He competed in the individual road race event at the 1984 Summer Olympics.

References

External links
 

1961 births
Living people
Cypriot male cyclists
Olympic cyclists of Cyprus
Cyclists at the 1984 Summer Olympics